Máxima (born Máxima Zorreguieta Cerruti; 17 May 1971) is Queen of the Netherlands as the wife of King Willem-Alexander. 

Argentine by birth, she worked in marketing when she met Willem-Alexander, eldest son and heir apparent of Queen Beatrix, in 1999. They married in 2002, and became king and queen on the abdication of her mother-in-law on 30 April 2013. Máxima has promoted social integration of immigrants, LGBT rights, and financial inclusion. She and Willem-Alexander have three daughters, Princesses Catharina-Amalia, Alexia, and Ariane, who are first, second, and third, respectively, in the line of succession.

Early life and education

Máxima Zorreguieta Cerruti was born in Buenos Aires, Argentina, on 17 May 1971. She is the daughter of Jorge Zorreguieta (1928–2017), who served as Secretary of Agriculture under General Jorge Rafael Videla during Argentina's last civil-military dictatorship (1976–1983), and his second wife, María del Carmen Cerruti Carricart (born 1944). She has two brothers, a sister (deceased), and three half-sisters by her father's first wife, Marta López Gil. She is named after her paternal great-grandmother Máxima Bonorino González (1874–1965), of Italian descent. Her father was a scion of the Zorreguieta family who had been landed gentry, professionals, regional politicians, and statesmen for generations. Her maternal great-grandfather was also from the landed gentry; Domingo Carricart Etchart (1885–1953) was a landowner, politician, Director of the Banco de la Provincia de Buenos Aires, first mayor of González Chaves, and mayor of Tres Arroyos. She also has Portuguese ancestry through her father's side, being a descendant of King Afonso III of Portugal.

She grew up in the Recoleta neighbourhood of Buenos Aires and studied at Northlands School, a bilingual school of the city of Olivos. She graduated with a degree in economics from the Pontifical Catholic University of Argentina (UCA) in 1995. This private university is governed by a directory of local bishops, including the current Pope Francis, then Archbishop of Buenos Aires and Grand Chancellor of UCA. During her student years, Francis presided over the traditional Mass at the beginning of classes. She later completed her studies with a master's degree in the United States.

From 1989 to 1990, while still in college, she worked for Mercado Abierto Electrónico S.A. From 1992 to 1995, she worked in the sales department of Boston Securities SA in Buenos Aires, where she conducted research on software for financial markets. From July 1996 to February 1998, she worked for HSBC James Capel Inc. in New York City, where she became vice president of institutional sales for Latin America. From then until July 1999, she was vice president of the emerging markets division of Dresdner Kleinwort Benson in New York. From May 2000 to March 2001, she worked for Deutsche Bank in Brussels. She also worked as a teacher of English to children and adults, and of mathematics for high-school students and freshmen.

Relationship with Willem-Alexander

Máxima met Willem-Alexander in April 1999 in Seville, Spain, during the Seville Spring Fair. In an interview, they stated that he introduced himself only as "Alexander", so that she did not know he was a prince. She thought he was joking when he later told her that he was the Prince of Orange and heir apparent to the Dutch throne. 
According to the unauthorised biography "Máxima. La construcción de una reina", she was invited to Seville by a friend living in New York who openly said she would introduce her to two European princes.
They agreed to meet again two weeks later in New York, where Máxima was working for Dresdner Kleinwort Benson. Their relationship apparently began in New York, but she did not meet his parents, Queen Beatrix and Prince Claus, for some time.

The news of the couple's relationship and eventual marriage plans caused controversy in the Netherlands, due to the involvement of Máxima's father Jorge Zorreguieta as a cabinet minister during the National Reorganization Process, the most recent Argentinian dictatorship. Her father's tenure as a minister took place during the beginning stages of the Dirty War (1974–82), a period of repression that saw about 30,000 people killed or disappeared during the seven-year military regime. At the request of the States General, Michiel Baud, a Dutch professor in Latin American studies, carried out an inquiry into the involvement of Zorreguieta in the Dirty War. Zorreguieta claimed that, as a civilian, he was unaware of the Dirty War while he was a cabinet minister. Baud determined that Máxima's father had not been directly involved in any of the numerous atrocities that took place during that period. However, Baud also concluded that Zorreguieta was almost certainly aware of them; in Baud's view, it was highly unlikely that a cabinet minister would not have known about them.

Marriage and family

The couple announced their engagement on 30 March 2001; Máxima addressed the nation in Dutch (which at the time she only spoke at a basic conversational level) during the live televised broadcast. Máxima was granted Dutch citizenship by a royal decree on 17 May 2001 and now has dual citizenship: Argentine and Dutch. The engagement was formally approved by the States General later that year—a necessary step for Willem-Alexander to remain in line to the throne.

Máxima and Willem-Alexander were married on 2 February 2002 in a civil ceremony in the Beurs van Berlage, Amsterdam, which was then followed by a religious ceremony at Amsterdam's Nieuwe Kerk ("New Church"). Máxima's parents were not present at the wedding; her father was told he could not attend due to his role as a cabinet minister during the National Reorganization Process, and her mother chose not to attend without her husband.

The couple are the parents of three daughters:

Activities

Queen Máxima has a particular concern for the integration of immigrants into Dutch culture. She was a member of a special parliamentary commission which sought to recommend ways to increase the participation of female immigrants in the workforce. Máxima stresses the importance for immigrants of learning the Dutch language (as she did) in order to fully participate in Dutch society. Dutch is the Queen's third language; she is also fluent in Spanish (her native language) and English. She speaks French at a conversational level.

In 2007, Máxima inadvertently caused a wave of massive criticism when in a speech to the Scientific Council for Government Policy she said that in the seven years that she had been in the Netherlands, she had been unable to find the Dutch identity. Maxima is quoted as having said the following: 

She participates in conferences around the world representing the Netherlands. She was granted a seat in the Dutch Council of State on 20 October 2004, the highest advisory body and court of administration. She was a member of the Committee for Ethnic Minority Women's Participation from July 2003 until 2005. She has a seat on the board of governors of the Chair on the Management of Diversity and Integration at the Vrije Universiteit Amsterdam; she (along with her husband) is a patron of the Orange Fund (established to promote social welfare and cohesion in the Netherlands); and she also chairs the Board of Trustees of the Prince Claus Chair in Development and Equity of the International Institute of Social Studies and the University of Utrecht.

Máxima is one of the few members of royal families anywhere in the world to be an open supporter of gay rights, and was the first member of a royal family to attend an LGBT rights conference, having attended a conference concerned with LGBT rights on 5 March 2008.

Queen Máxima has been honorary chair of the Money Wise Platform since 2010. In this capacity, the Queen focuses attention on the importance of financial education and managing money sensibly, especially where children and young people are concerned. The Queen acts as special advisor to the Platform and consults with interested parties on ways of increasing people's financial awareness and resilience.

Since 10 June 2015, Queen Máxima has been the honorary chair of the Ambassadors for Music at School Platform. Queen Máxima has for some years been committed to giving as many children as possible the opportunity to create music.

Queen Máxima is a member of the Committee for Enterprise and Finance, which succeeded the Microfinance Council in 2011. The Queen is committed to extending the reach of various financing opportunities, both through coaching and by providing credit for new and existing small businesses in the Netherlands. She also works to increase the number of women entrepreneurs and the scope they have to expand their businesses.

Since March of 2022 Queen Máxima is a Honorary President of "MIND Us" – a mental health platform created in collaboration with the MIND Foundation.

UNSGSA 
Queen Máxima currently serves as the United Nations Secretary-General's Special Advocate for Inclusive Finance for Development (UNSGSA). The UN Secretary-General Ban Ki-Moon designated her to this role in September 2009 in order to raise awareness on the importance of inclusive financial systems for achieving economic and development goals such as poverty alleviation, food security and education. In her work as UNSGSA, the Queen focuses on how formal financial services such as savings, insurance, and credit can prevent people from falling into poverty due to expenditures on healthcare, and people who are not able to protect themselves against rising food prices and poverty because they do not have access to basic savings accounts. The role of the UNSGSA is to foster action by governments, private sector, financial system standard setters, and others towards a more inclusive financial system that works for the poor. In later years, her focus as a special advocate expanded to advocating digital financial inclusion, financial health, responsible technology for financial inclusion to support Sustainable Development Goals and agricultural finance. Máxima is also an advocate for increase access to financial services, improve consumer protection and enhance financial literacy. According to the UNSGSA website, she "aims to unlock development opportunities and economic inclusion for all."

Queen Máxima visited several countries on behalf of the United Nations. She also recorded video for the launch of the Global Findex Database 2021. Queen Máxima is also the honorary patron of the G20 Global Partnership for Financial Inclusion (GPFI) since June 2011. In this role she works with governments and partners to advance the G20 Action Plan on Financial Inclusion, and the G20 Financial Inclusion Peer Learning Program. Previously, the Queen was a member of the Advisors Group for the United Nations' International Year of Microcredit 2005 and until 2009, was a member of UN Advisors Group on Inclusive Financial Sectors. She also work as the Global Agenda Trustee for the World Economic Forum's Global Challenge Initiative on the Future of the Global Financial System. Máxima convened the CEO Partnership for Economic Inclusion.

Titles, honours and arms

By a decree issued on 25 January 2002, upon the solemnization of marriage, Máxima Zorreguieta was granted the titles Princess of the Netherlands and Princess of Orange-Nassau, and the style Royal Highness was formally conferred upon her. She also became "mevrouw van Amsberg" (Mrs. van Amsberg).

Another decree issued on the same day also granted her own personal coat of arms and a personal standard.

On 13 May 2011, the Dutch parliament confirmed that Máxima would become queen consort of the Netherlands upon her husband's accession, after a debate over her future title and style. On 28 January 2013, it was announced that Queen Beatrix would abdicate on 30 April in favour of Willem-Alexander. Máxima is the kingdom's first queen consort since Princess Emma of Waldeck and Pyrmont, the second wife of William III. She is the first Dutch queen to have been born as a commoner, and the first to have been born outside Europe.

Royal titles and styles
 2 February 200230 April 2013: Her Royal Highness Princess Máxima of the Netherlands, Princess of Orange-Nassau, Mrs. van Amsberg
 30 April 2013present: Her Majesty the Queen or Her Majesty Queen Máxima

Máxima's full title is: Her Majesty Queen Máxima, Princess of the Netherlands, Princess of Orange-Nassau.

Honours

National
 : 
  Knight Grand Cross of the Order of the Netherlands Lion 
  Recipient of the Wedding Medal of Prince Willem-Alexander, Prince of Orange and Máxima Zorreguieta
  King Willem-Alexander Investiture Medal (30 April 2013)
 Grand Cross of the Order of the House of Orange (6 May 2021)

Foreign
: Grand Star of the Decoration of Honour for Services to the Republic of Austria 
 : 
 Dame Grand Cross of the Order of Leopold
 Dame Grand Cross of the Order of the Crown
 : Grand Cross of the Order of the Southern Cross
 : Member First Class of the Family Order of Laila Utama
 : First Class of the Medal of Merit
 : Grand Cross of the Order of Merit
 : Grand Cross of the Order of the Cross of Terra Mariana
 : Knight of the Order of the Elephant
 : Grand Cross of the Order of National Merit
 : 
 Grand Cross 1st class of the Order of Merit of the Federal Republic of Germany (8 October 2007)
 Grand Cross Special Class of the Order of Merit of the Federal Republic of Germany (5 July 2021)
 : Grand Cross of the Order of the Redeemer (31 October 2022)
 : Grand Cross of the Order of Merit of the Italian Republic
 : Dame Grand Cordon (Paulownia) of the Order of the Precious Crown
 : Grand Cross of the Order of the Three Stars
: Grand Cross of the Order for Merits to Lithuania
 : 
Knight of the Order of the Gold Lion of the House of Nassau
Grand Cross of the Order of Adolphe of Nassau
 : Grand Cross of the Order of the Aztec Eagle
 : Dame Grand Cross of the Order of Saint Olav 
 : Dame Grand Cordon of the Order of Sultan Qaboos
 : Grand Cross of the Order of the White Eagle
 : Grand Cross with Collar of the Order of Prince Henry
: Grand Cross of the Order of the White Double Cross (7 March 2023)
 : Dame Grand Cross of the Order of Isabella the Catholic
 : 
Member Grand Cross of the Royal Order of the Polar Star (21 April 2009)
Member of the Royal Order of the Seraphim (11 October 2022)
 : Grand Cross of the Order of Union

Arms

Notes

References

Notes

External links

Queen Máxima at the website of the Royal House

|-

1971 births
Living people
People from Buenos Aires
People from Wassenaar
Argentine emigrants to the Netherlands
Argentine Roman Catholics
Argentine people of Basque descent
Argentine people of Italian descent
Argentine people of French descent
Dutch queens consort
House of Orange-Nassau
Princesses of Orange
Princesses of Orange-Nassau
Members of the Council of State (Netherlands)
Dutch people of Argentine descent
Dutch people of Basque descent
Dutch Roman Catholics

Commanders Grand Cross of the Order of the Polar Star
Dames Grand Cross of the Order of Isabella the Catholic
Grand Crosses of the Order of the Crown (Belgium)
Grand Crosses Special Class of the Order of Merit of the Federal Republic of Germany
Grand Cordons of the Order of the Precious Crown
Grand Collars of the Order of Prince Henry
Knights Grand Cross of the Order of Merit of the Italian Republic
Princesses by marriage